Anthony DiPaolo is an American businessman and the president and chief executive officer (CEO) of Work 'N Gear, a workwear and healthcare fashion retailer.

Career

Early career 
DiPaolo's career began at Mitsubishi where he was a footwear sales representative responsible for $20 million in sales and product development. While at Mitsubishi, he traveled throughout Europe, the Far East and Eastern Bloc countries to broker trade agreements between Dow Chemical, the Government of Romania and the other Eastern Bloc countries. DiPaolo later joined Shoe Visions, a United States footwear brand sold in major American retailers such as JCPenney, G.R. Kinney Company and Thom McAn.

Herman Survivors 
In 1990, DiPaolo acquired Herman Survivors from former owners, Stride Rite Corporation, and its sales later rose from $8 million to $50 million. In 2001, he sold Herman Survivors to the American public multinational corporation, Walmart.

Work 'N Gear 
In 2002, DiPaolo purchased Work 'N Gear, which was in bankruptcy, and became the President and CEO where he raised $40 million in investments from venture capitalists. Since then, he formed a new management team and brand focused on the workwear marketplace.

Scrubology 
In 2011, DiPoalo launched Scrubology—a new "store-within-a-store" concept that caters to healthcare consumers. In conjunction with Sears Holdings Corporation, Scrubology was launched in 39 Sears and Kmart locations across the United States.

Sears Holdings Corporation named Scrubology the 2012 "Partner in Transformation" and agreed to launch an additional 52 stores in major metropolitan locations within California, Minnesota, New Jersey, New York, Philadelphia and Washington, DC. Scrubology's flagship website was launched in June 2012 to expand the brand's reach beyond brick-and-mortar locations around the United States.

References

External links 
 Work 'N Gear's Website
 South Shore Art Center's website

1958 births
Businesspeople from Massachusetts
George Washington University alumni
People from Cohasset, Massachusetts
Living people
American retail chief executives
American chief executives of fashion industry companies